Nizhnyaya Verbovka is a rural locality (a khutor) in Chernyshkovskoye Urban Settlement, Chernyshkovsky District, Volgograd Oblast, Russia. The population was 147 as of 2010. There are 3 streets.

Geography 
Nizhnyaya Verbovka is located 6 km northwest of Chernyshkovsky (the district's administrative centre) by road. Chernyshkovsky is the nearest rural locality.

References 

Rural localities in Chernyshkovsky District